Thelazia is a genus of nematode worms which parasitize the eyes and associated tissues of various bird and mammal hosts, including humans.  They are often called "eyeworms", and infestation with Thelazia species is referred to as "thelaziasis" (occasionally spelled "thelaziosis"). Adults are usually found in the eyelids, tear glands, tear ducts, or the so-called "third eyelid" (nictitating membrane).  Occasionally, they are found in the eyeball itself, either under the conjunctiva (the membrane that covers the white part of the eye) or in the vitreous cavity of the eyeball.  All species of Thelazia for which the life cycle has been studied are transmitted by species of Diptera (flies) which do not bite, but which feed on tears.

Representative species

Thelazia anolabiata (Molin, 1860)
 Definitive hosts: Andean cock-of-the-rock (Rupicola peruviana) and many other Brazilian birds
 Intermediate hosts: Not known
 Distribution: South America
Thelazia bubalis Ramanujachari and Alwar, 1952
 Definitive hosts: Water buffalo
 Intermediate hosts: Not known
 Distribution: India
Thelazia californiensis Price, 1930
 Definitive hosts: Dog (Canis familiaris), cat (Felis catus),  occasionally human (Homo sapiens), domestic sheep (Ovis aries), mule deer (Odocoileus hemionus), coyote (Canis latrans) and American black bear (Ursus americanus).
 Intermediate hosts: Lesser house fly (Fannia canicularis) and Fannia benjamini
 Distribution: Western North America
Thelazia callipaeda Railliet & Henry, 1910 (sometimes called "Oriental eyeworm")
 Definitive hosts: Typically reported from dog (Canis familiaris), cat (Felis catus),  and occasionally reported from grey wolf (Canis lupus), raccoon dog (Nyctereutes procyonoides), red fox (Vulpes vulpes), European rabbit (Oryctolagus cuniculus). Over 250 cases of T. callipaeda infestation in humans have been reported thus far.
 Intermediate hosts: Fruit flies (Amiota (Phortica) variegata in Europe, and Phortica okadai in China)
 Distribution: Asia and Europe
Thelazia erschowi Oserskaja, 1931
 Definitive hosts: Pig (Sus domesticus)
 Intermediate host: Not known
 Distribution: Post-Soviet states
Thelazia gulosa (Railliet & Henry, 1910)
 Definitive hosts: Yak (Bos grunniens) and other cattle (Bos taurus), and rarely human (Homo sapiens)
 Intermediate hosts: Face fly (Musca autumnalis) in Europe and North America, Musca larvipara in the Ukraine, Musca vitripennis in Crimea, and Musca amica in the Far East
 Distribution: Asia, Europe, and North America
Thelazia lacrymalis (Gurlt, 1831)
 Definitive hosts: Horse (Equus caballus) and cattle (Bos taurus)
 Intermediate hosts: Face fly (Musca autumnalis) and Musca osiris
 Distribution: Asia, Europe, Middle East, North America and South America
Thelazia leesei Railliet & Henry, 1910
 Definitive hosts: Dromedary (Camelus dromedarius) and Bactrian camel (Camelus bactrianus)
 Intermediate hosts: Flies (Musca lucidulus)
 Distribution: Post-Soviet states and India
Thelazia rhodesii (Desmarest, 1828)
 Definitive hosts: mainly bovids, cattle (Bos taurus), water buffalo (Bubalus bubalis), zebu (Bos indicus), bison (Bison bonasus), and sometimes horse (Equus caballus), domestic sheep (Ovis aries), dromedary (Camelus dromedarius), and goat (Capra hircus)
 Intermediate hosts: Face fly (Musca autumnalis, Musca larvipara, and Musca sorbens)
 Distribution: Africa, Asia, and Europe
Thelazia skrjabini Erschow, 1928
 Definitive hosts: Cattle (Bos taurus) and yak (Bos grunniens)
 Intermediate hosts: Face fly (Musca autumnalis), Musca vitripennis, and Musca amica
 Distribution: Europe and North America

See also 

 Nematode
 John Stoffolano

References 

Spirurida
Secernentea genera
Parasitic nematodes of vertebrates
Veterinary helminthology